The TIM Trophy is a football pre-season tournament that was firstly contested in August 2001. It is not sanctioned or recognized by official football bodies since the gameplay rules do not correspond to IFAB/FIFA laws of football. For the first twelve editions, the competing teams were Juventus, Internazionale and Milan. For both the 2013 and 2014 editions, Internazionale opted not to participate and was replaced by Sassuolo. For 2015, Juventus declined to participate while Internazionale returned. In the 2016 edition, Internazionale opted out again, and was replaced by Celta Vigo, becoming the first non-Italian team to compete in the tournament, and leaving Milan as the only original team participating. To date, no tournament has been held since 2016. Overall, Internazionale has eight titles, Milan five, and Juventus, Sassuolo and Celta Vigo one each.

The teams play three round-robin 45-minute matches. If any match ends in a draw, it is decided by a penalty shoot-out. Three points are awarded for a victory during regular play, with zero points awarded to the loser. If the match is decided by penalties, the winner is awarded two points and the loser one point. The organizers decide which two teams would play in the first match of the evening. The third team then play against the losing team from the first match, and end the tournament by playing against the first-match winner.

Winners

Winners by year
2001:  Milan
2002:  Internazionale
2003:  Internazionale
2004:  Internazionale
2005:  Internazionale
2006:  Milan
2007:  Internazionale
2008:  Milan
2009:  Juventus
2010:  Internazionale
2011:  Internazionale
2012:  Internazionale
2013:  Sassuolo
2014:  Milan
2015:  Milan
2016:  Celta Vigo

Editions

2001 TIM Trophy

Standings
3 points for a win, 0 points for a defeat
2 points for a penalty shoot-out win, 1 point for a penalty shoot-out defeat
Milan won the tournament

Scorers

Matches

2002 TIM Trophy

Standings
3 points for a win, 0 points for a defeat
2 points for a penalty shoot-out win, 1 point for a penalty shoot-out defeat
Internazionale won the tournament

Scorers

Matches

2003 TIM Trophy

Standings
3 points for a win, 0 points for a defeat
2 points for a penalty shoot-out win, 1 point for a penalty shoot-out defeat
Internazionale won the tournament

Scorers

Matches

2004 TIM Trophy

Standings
3 points for a win, 0 points for a defeat
2 points for a penalty shoot-out win, 1 point for a penalty shoot-out defeat
Internazionale won the tournament

Scorers

Matches

2005 TIM Trophy

Standings
3 points for a win, 0 points for a defeat
2 points for a penalty shoot-out win, 1 point for a penalty shoot-out defeat
Internazionale won the tournament

Scorers

Matches

2006 TIM Trophy

Standings
3 points for a win, 0 points for a defeat
2 points for a penalty shoot-out win, 1 point for a penalty shoot-out defeat
Milan won the tournament

Scorers

Matches

2007 TIM Trophy

Standings
3 points for a win, 0 points for a defeat
2 points for a penalty shoot-out win, 1 point for a penalty shoot-out defeat
Internazionale won the tournament

Scorers

Matches

2008 TIM Trophy

Standings
3 points for a win, 0 points for a defeat
2 points for a penalty shoot-out win, 1 point for a penalty shoot-out defeat
Milan won the tournament based on head-to-head result

Scorers

Matches

2009 TIM Trophy

Standings
3 points for a win, 0 points for a defeat
2 points for a penalty shoot-out win, 1 point for a penalty shoot-out defeat
Juventus won the tournament for the first time

Scorers

Matches

2010 TIM Trophy

Standings
3 points for a win, 0 points for a defeat
2 points for a penalty shoot-out win, 1 point for a penalty shoot-out defeat
Internazionale won the tournament

Scorers

Matches

2011 TIM Trophy

Standings
3 points for a win, 0 points for a defeat
2 points for a penalty shoot-out win, 1 point for a penalty shoot-out defeat
Internazionale won the tournament

Scorers

Matches

2012 TIM Trophy

Standings
3 points for a win, 0 points for a defeat
2 points for a penalty shoot-out win, 1 point for a penalty shoot-out defeat
Internazionale won the tournament

Scorers

Matches

2013 TIM Trophy

Standings
3 points for a win, 0 points for a defeat
2 points for a penalty shoot-out win, 1 point for a penalty shoot-out defeat
Internazionale decided not to participate
Sassuolo participated in tournament for first time

Scorers

Matches

2014 TIM Trophy

Standings
3 points for a win, 0 points for a defeat
2 points for a penalty shoot-out win, 1 point for a penalty shoot-out defeat
Internazionale decided not to participate

Scorers

Matches

2015 TIM Trophy

Standings
3 points for a win, 0 points for a defeat
2 points for a penalty shoot-out win, 1 point for a penalty shoot-out defeat
Juventus decided not to participate

Scorers

Matches

2016 TIM Trophy

Standings
3 points for a win, 0 points for a defeat
2 points for a penalty shoot-out win, 1 point for a penalty shoot-out defeat
Celta Vigo became the first non-Italian team to compete and win the competition

Scorers

Matches

References

Italian football friendly trophies
Recurring sporting events established in 2001
2001 establishments in Italy